Additi Gupta (born 21 April 1988) is an Indian television actress, best known for playing Heer in Kis Desh Mein Hai Meraa Dil and Khan Begum in Qubool Hai.

Early life
Gupta was born on 21 April 1988 in Bhopal, Madhya Pradesh to Ved Prakash and Kavita Gupta. Her sister Megha Gupta is also a television actress.

Career
Gupta's first role on television was as  Heer Maan in Ekta Kapoor's production Kis Desh Mein Hai Meraa Dil. Gupta earned an Indian Telly Award for Best Actress in a Lead Role nomination, but went off air in 2010.

After Kis Desh Mein Hai Meraa Dil, participated in Zara Nachke Dikha where her team won was well received in exception. Gul Khan signed her to play a negative role in the daily TV soap, Qubool Hai via Zee TV from 2014. Qubool Hai wrapped up in January 2016.

In October 2016, Gupta was cast as Sanjana Singhal in the Star Plus drama Pardes Mein Hai Meraa Dil, an inspiration of the 1997 film Pardes. She left her role five months later, due to creative issues. She next landed Ishqbaaaz with the same channel and was seen as Ragini Sparsh Malhotra. She entered the series along with Ankit Raaj.

In November 2018, Gupta starred opposite Gautam Rode as the female lead Archana in Star Bharat's Kaal Bhairav Rahasya 2.

Gupta portrayed Dr. Deepika Sinha Sardesai in Dhadkan Zindaggi Kii from 2021 to 2022. She received praises for her role.

Personal life
Gupta got engaged to her boyfriend businessman Kabir Chopra in September 2018. She married Chopra in Mumbai in October 2018.

Filmography

Television

Special appearances

Films

Awards and nominations

See also 
 List of Indian television actresses

References

External links
 
 

Living people
Actresses from Mumbai
Indian television actresses
Actresses in Hindi television
Indian soap opera actresses
1988 births